Haverstock is an area of the London Borough of Camden: specifically the east of Belsize Park, north of Chalk Farm and west of Kentish Town.  It is centred on Queens Crescent and Malden Road. Gospel Oak is to the north, Camden Town to the south.

Built environment
The Queen's Crescent NW5 area to the east of the hill is home to Queen's Crescent Market.  If divided into nine equal sections the north-east to south-east third has most of the high density council housing centred on sports facilities at the  Talacre Gardens which adjoins Kentish Town West railway station In the west a notable estate of partial social blocks is the Maitland Park Estate, Maitland Park Villas.  Grand, classical architecture long roads are from west to east: Eton Road, Adelaide Road, Prince of Wales Road, Parkhill Road, Maitland Park Road, Queens Crescent and the east of Marsden Street and Malden Road.

Nearby open spaces and hills
Primrose Hill and Hampstead Heath are within 500 metres (of the south-west and north edges) of the ward.

Haverstock Hill, Rosslyn Hill, and Heath Street, Hampstead constitute a 2.8 km rise of 99 m, with an average gradient of 3.5% (maximum 8.5%).

Cultural groups, entertainment and retail
The area is ethnically and socially diverse, and the marketplace and surrounding area is well known for its African, Jamaican, South American and Eastern European culture, well reflected in the ethnic food stalls and clothes shops in the area.

The top of Queens Crescent is a diverse 20  street and part-time market lined with about 30 shops/salons including a modern library, post office, two pharmacies, the Sir Robert Peel and specialist grocery shops selling a broad mixture of convenience and exotic foods. These are supplemented with corner cafés and hot food takeaways.

On this street Queen's Crescent Street Market has served the area and Gospel Oak for over 100 years and now frequently hosts farmers' markets and guest traders from across the UK. The marketplace and surrounding area is well known for its African, Jamaican, South American and Eastern European culture.

Neighbouring streets of Kentish Town Road, east, and Chalk Farm Road, south-east are focussed on rows of bars, pubs, clubs and restaurants.

Music and performance
The Barfly club, which launched many artists of the Britpop era, and the Roundhouse venue are in Chalk Farm Road, where among other bar-nightclubs on the road including The Enterprise Bar has two extra floors for gigs and weekend DJs; it culminates in Camden Market and facing restaurants/nightlife venues.

Literature
Sir Richard Steele, writer, playwright, politician and co-founder of The Spectator, went to live in Haverstock Hill in 1712. The site of his cottage is commemorated in the name of the Sir Richard Steele pub at 97 Haverstock Hill. Writer and dramatist Douglas Jerrold was living in Haverstock in 1838.

'The Haverstock Hill Murder' is a detective story by George R Sims in his story collection Dorcas Dene, Detective (1897) and features an early example of a female detective in crime fiction.  It was dramatised for BBC Radio in 2008.

Demography
In the labour market, its claimant count for unemployment is the same as nationally, as at March 2018: 2.1%.  This compares to a borough-wide average of 1.7%.

Transport
In the ward:
Kentish Town West — in the east
Chalk Farm  — in the south
Beyond the north-west border:
Belsize Park

Famous residents

 Marwa Abdalla, President of Somalia
 Lindsay Duncan, actress
 Baroness Helena Kennedy, barrister and broadcaster
 Denis Lawson, actor
 Dame Ann Leslie, Daily Mail journalist and writer
 Hilton McRae, actor
 Billie Piper, actress and singer
 Leonard Whiting, actor
 Zeinab Badawi, BBC news presenter has a home in the Haverstock Hill area
 Frank Skinner, Comedian
 Bill Oddie, Comedian, Presenter
 Sylvester McCoy, Actor
 John Lahr. Writer 
Haverstock School includes former leader of the Labour Party Ed Miliband and former Members of Parliament David Miliband and Oona King amongst its alumni and alumna

Politics

Haverstock is represented by three councillors on the Camden London Borough Council. As of 2019, the local councillors are Alison Kelly, Abdul Quadir and Gail McAnena Wood, all of the Labour Party.

The ward forms part of the Holborn and St. Pancras constituency, which has been represented by the Labour Party since its creation in 1983. The current Member of Parliament is Keir Starmer.

References
References

Notes

Areas of London
Districts of the London Borough of Camden